Habenaria yueana is a species of plant in the family Orchidaceae. It is endemic to China.

References

Endemic orchids of China
yueana
Vulnerable flora of Asia
Taxonomy articles created by Polbot
Taxobox binomials not recognized by IUCN